Ferencvárosi TC (women) or Ferencváros (women) may refer to:

 Ferencvárosi TC (women's football)
 Ferencvárosi TC (women's handball)
 Ferencvárosi TC (women's basketball)